Paul Shrubb (1 August 195528 May 2020) was an English professional footballer, coach and scout who made 350 appearances as a player in the Football League, most notably for Brentford and Aldershot. He later returned to Aldershot as assistant manager and coached at a number of non-League clubs.

Playing career

Fulham 
Shrubb began his career in the youth system at Second Division club Fulham and signed his first professional contract in 1972. He made his debut during the 1972–73 season, which would be his only appearance before his departure in 1975.

Hellenic 
Shrubb moved to South Africa to sign for National Football League club Hellenic in 1975. The high point of his time with the club was reaching the final of the 1976 NFL Cup, which was lost to Cape Town City.

Brentford 
Shrubb returned to England and joined Fourth Division club Brentford in March 1977. With a small squad of players, Shrubb blossomed as a utility player in defence and midfield and contributed to the Bees' promotion to the Third Division in the 1977–78 season. Shrubb took over as captain from Jackie Graham for a time, while Graham was out injured. Shrubb missed only a handful of games per season until the 1981–82 campaign, when he was dropped early in the season. He departed the Bees in August 1982, having made 198 appearances and scored eight goals during his five years with the club.

Aldershot 
Shrubb signed for Fourth Division club Aldershot in August 1982. He made 202 appearances and scored six goals during a five-season spell and departed after the Shots' success in the 1987 Fourth Division play-off final. He put his skills as a utility player to good use, wearing every single shirt number (1–11) during his time with the club.

Non-League football 
Shrubb dropped into non-League football in 1987 and had spells with Isthmian League clubs Woking, Dorking, Leatherhead, Cove and Wessex League club Fleet Town.

Return to Aldershot 
Shrubb signed for Isthmian League Third Division phoenix club Aldershot Town in 1992. The Shots won the Third Division championship during the 1992–93 season and secured promotion to First Division in the following campaign. He made 31 appearances before retiring in January 1995. Shrubb was awarded a testimonial versus Charlton Athletic on 1 August 2007, in recognition of his service to the club.

Management and coaching career 
Between 1987 and 1992, Shrubb held player-coach roles with Woking, Dorking, Leatherhead, Fleet Town and Cove. When he returned to Aldershot in 1992, he became player-assistant manager of the club and was caretaker manager for one match in 1995, after the departure of Steve Wignall. He was offered the job on a permanent basis but turned it down, citing work commitments. After his retirement from playing, Shrubb served as Steve Wigley's assistant, before departing the Recreation Ground for the final time in 1997. He later served Hampton and Kingstonian as a coach and resigned from the latter club in April 2001, in protest over the sacking of fellow coach Ian McDonald.

Scouting career 
Shrubb served as a scout at Charlton Athletic, Plymouth Argyle and AFC Wimbledon. While with Plymouth Argyle, he worked alongside former Aldershot teammate Andy King.

Personal life 
Shrubb lived in Aldershot and ran his own window cleaning business. As of 2014, he was living in Ash, Surrey. Shrubb was diagnosed with motor neurone disease in January 2006 and was given two years to live by doctors. The condition forced him to give up full-time work in 2009. Shrubb died of the disease in May 2020.

Career statistics

Honours 
Brentford
 Football League Fourth Division fourth-place promotion: 1977–78
Aldershot/Aldershot Town
Football League Fourth Division play-offs: 1986–87
Isthmian League Second Division third-place promotion: 1993–94
Isthmian League Third Division: 1992–93

References 

1955 births
Sportspeople from Guildford
English footballers
Brentford F.C. players
English Football League players
Hellenic F.C. players
Fulham F.C. players
Aldershot F.C. players
National Football League (South Africa) players
Association football midfielders
English expatriate footballers
2020 deaths
English expatriate sportspeople in South Africa
Woking F.C. players
Dorking F.C. players
Isthmian League players
Leatherhead F.C. players
Fleet Town F.C. players
Cove F.C. players
Aldershot Town F.C. players
Aldershot Town F.C. managers
Charlton Athletic F.C. non-playing staff
Plymouth Argyle F.C. non-playing staff
AFC Wimbledon non-playing staff
Isthmian League managers
Footballers from Surrey
English football managers
Aldershot Town F.C. non-playing staff
Neurological disease deaths in England
Deaths from motor neuron disease